Music's in Trouble is the Drugs' debut album, released in 2002 on CD. It earned the Drugs positive press, an appearance on Rove Live, an ARIA award and spawned four singles: "The Bold and the Beautiful", "Metal vs. Hip Hop", "Burger King" and "Was Sport Better in the 70's?". "Burger King" was released as a free download from the Drugs' website and Yahoo! Groups list as a Christmas present from the band.

Track list 

2002 debut albums
The Drugs albums